Lenola  may refer to:

Lenola, Lazio - A town in Italy
Lenola (band) - A rock band
Moorestown-Lenola, New Jersey - A census-designated place near Philadelphia